Giannis Papadopoulos (born 21 September 1998) is a Greek professional footballer who plays as a goalkeeper for Super League 2 club Veria.

References

1998 births
Living people
Greek footballers
Super League Greece players
Football League (Greece) players
AEK Athens F.C. players
Kavala F.C. players
Veria NFC players
Association football goalkeepers
Footballers from Aigio